Tategami is a Japanese word that may refer to:

Standing hair (鬣), mane
 full head of hair on a young samurai
 Tategami (GO!GO!7188 album)

Standing paper (立紙);
 Tategami, vertical paper orders used during the time of Hideyoshi time for general statutes, contrasting with the style of horizontally folded origami orders, and kirigami

Standing gods (立神)
 Tategami dry dock and piers (立神港区) of Sasebo, Nagasaki
 Tategami Shrine in Arida, Wakayama (:ja:立神社 (有田市))